Esko Olavi Seppänen (born 15 February 1946) is a Finnish former politician representing the Left Alliance. He was a Member of the European Parliament (MEP) from 1996 to 2009, and a member of the Finnish parliament from 1987 to 1996.

In the European Parliament Seppänen was Member of the Bureau of the European United Left–Nordic Green Left and sat on the European Parliament's Committee on Budgets. He also was a substitute for the Committee on Budgetary Control and the Committee on Industry, Research and Energy.

Seppänen was born in Oulu, and began politics by joining the Social Democratic Youth. In 1974 he joined the Communist Party of Finland. He belonged to the more Eurocommunist majority of the party (as opposed to the Taistoist Neo-Stalinist minority). In 1989 Seppänen opposed merging the Communist Party into the new Left Alliance (Vasemmistoliitto), criticizing the procedure as undemocratic. Nevertheless, Esko Seppänen worked in the leadership of the new party until 2001.

Seppänen has a bachelor's degree in business studies (1971). He worked as journalist at Yleisradio in 1970–1987.

References

External links
 
 
 

1946 births
Living people
People from Oulu
Communist Party of Finland politicians
Finnish People's Democratic League politicians
Left Alliance (Finland) politicians
Members of the Parliament of Finland (1987–91)
Members of the Parliament of Finland (1991–95)
Members of the Parliament of Finland (1995–99)
Left Alliance (Finland) MEPs
MEPs for Finland 1996–1999
MEPs for Finland 1999–2004
MEPs for Finland 2004–2009